Theater Camp is a 2023 American comedy film directed by Molly Gordon and Nick Lieberman in their directorial debuts, from a screenplay by Gordon, Lieberman, Ben Platt, and Noah Galvin. A feature-length adaptation of the 2020 short film of the same name, it features an ensemble cast, led by Gordon, Platt, Galvin, Jimmy Tatro, Patti Harrison, Ayo Edebiri, Alan Kim, and Amy Sedaris. Will Ferrell serves as a producer under his Gloria Sanchez Productions banner.

It premiered at the 2023 Sundance Film Festival on January 21, 2023, where it was acquired by Searchlight Pictures.

Cast

Production
In June 2022, it was reported Molly Gordon and Nick Lieberman would direct the film, from a screenplay they wrote alongside Ben Platt and Noah Galvin. Gordon, Platt, Galvin, Jimmy Tatro, Patti Harrison, Ayo Edebiri, Amy Sedaris, Caroline Aaron, Nathan Lee Graham, Owen Thiele, Alan Kim, Luke Islam, Jack Sobolewski, Kyndra Sanchez, Quinn Titcomb, Madisen Lora,  Bailee Bonick, Donovan Colan, Vivienne Sachs, and Alexander Bello were set to star, and Will Ferrell would serve as a producer under his Gloria Sanchez Productions banner.

Release
Theater Camp had a world premiere at the 2023 Sundance Film Festival on January 21, 2023, where it received two standing ovations from the audience, one following the film itself and after a special post-screening musical performance from the younger actors of a medley of songs from the film's finale. Shortly after, Searchlight Pictures acquired distribution rights to the film for $8 million.  The film is scheduled to be theatricality released on July 14, 2023.

Reception 
On review aggregator website Rotten Tomatoes, the film has an approval rating of 83% based on 40 reviews, with an average rating of 7.5/10.

References

External links
 
 

2023 films
2023 directorial debut films
Gloria Sanchez Productions films
Searchlight Pictures films
Films produced by Will Ferrell
Features based on short films
2023 independent films
American comedy films
American LGBT-related films
LGBT-related comedy films
2023 LGBT-related films
2023 comedy films
2020s American films